Onychocrinus  is an extinct genus of crinoids.

Fossil records
This genus is known in the fossil records of the Carboniferous period of United States and Canada (age range: 353.8 to 318.1 million years ago).

Bibliography
 F. Springer. 1906. Discovery of the Disk of Onychocrinus, and Further Remarks on the Crinoidea Flexibilia. The Journal of Geology, Volume 14.
 A. S. Horowitz. 1956. Fauna of Glen Dean Limestone (Chester) in Indiana and Northern Kentucky. unpublished Ph.D. thesis, Indiana University 1-449
 N. G. Lane, J. L. Matthews, E. G. Driscoll and E. L. Yochelson. 1973. Paleontology and paleoecology of the Crawfordsville fossil site (Upper Osagian: Indiana). University of California Publications in Geological Sciences 99:1-141
 W. I. Ausich. 1978. Community Organization, Paleontology, and Sedimentology of the Lower Mississippian Borden Delta Platform (Edwardsville Formation, Southern Indiana). Unpublished Doctoral Dissertation, Indiana University 1-433
 T. W. Kammer and W. I. Ausich. 2007. Stratigraphical and geographical distribution of Mississippian (Lower Carboniferous) Crinoidea from Scotland. Earth and Environmental Science Transactions of the Royal Society of Edinburgh 98:139-150

References 

See also List of crinoid genera

Taxocrinida
Prehistoric crinoid genera
Paleozoic life of Alberta